Coolhaus is an American ice cream company based in Los Angeles, California, founded in 2009 by two women named Natasha Case and Freya Estreller. Coolhaus is an artisan ice cream brand known for combining Food and Architecture. The name Coolhaus, is in the German language, and when translated into English it is Coolhouse.

As of September 2017, Coolhaus distributes in at least 6,000 grocery stores such as Whole Foods and Safeway. Some of the items Coolhaus distributes are ice cream sandwiches, artisan pints and chocolate-dipped bars. In addition, Coolhaus operates food trucks and Ice Cream Shops.

Coolhaus has received coverage from CNN Money, CNBC, and USA Today. With flavors such as Milkshake and Fries and Street Cart Churro Dough,

History

Coolhaus started as an art project, but rapidly grew into a business and was founded in April 2009. Coolhaus flavors have names derived from architects and architectural movements.
The co-founders launched the company with a converted it into a food truck, and used it to sell ice cream sandwiches at the popular Coachella Valley Music and Arts Festival. Coolhaus subsequently went viral with Twitter followers and inquiries from the Los Angeles Times and other media outlets. Case left her job at Disney within a month and a half and committed full-time to Coolhaus.

After Coachella, Coolhaus fixed its silver and bubblegum-pink truck and continued to grow. Coolhaus added trucks in Austin, Texas, in 2010 and New York City in 2011, and opened its first storefront in Culver City, California, in 2011. By 2012, Coolhaus' fleet of ten trucks and one food cart had expanded to Miami, Florida, and Fast Company described Coolhaus as "the first gourmet branded truck with a national reach".

Since then, Coolhaus has rapidly expanded its range of products and distribution channels, with an increased focus on retail distribution of prepackaged goods. In an interview with Entrepreneur, Case explained that retail distribution allows Coolhaus to reach as many consumers as possible, and gives the company a scalable business model in which "you grow the revenue tremendously without necessarily increasing overhead." Coolhaus went from 3 Whole Foods retail partner stores in spring 2011 carrying 4 SKU's, to over 2,000 by June 2014 and 2,500 by September 2014,  carrying 24 SKU's as of December 2017. According to Case, Coolhaus stands apart from its competitors "because of our tri-fold approach in the marketplace: trucks, brick and mortar AND wholesale distribution. I haven't seen any truck diversify like with have with channels in grocery stores, movie theaters, stadiums and fashion retailers." Estreller estimates that over one million Coolhaus sammies were consumed in 2013 and projects nearly $6 million in revenue for 2014.Forbes magazine named Case to its "30 Under 30" for Food & Wine, a list of "the field's brightest stars under the age of 30", in 2012.

Reception

Coolhaus has received widespread attention in newspapers, magazines, television, and social media. Coolhaus has earned recognition in various Zagat features, and placed second in Zagat editors' 2012 ranking of New York's 8 Best Food Trucks.InStyle called Coolhaus the "ice cream brand for every craving imaginable".

ABC's morning television show Good Morning America posted Coolhaus recipes on its website and teamed with the company to create its own, exclusive ice cream flavor, chosen by audience votes.

Distribution 

, Coolhaus runs two Los Angeles-area storefronts in Old Town Pasadena and the Culver City Arts District, and operates a fleet of eleven mobile ice cream trucks and carts in Southern California, New York City, and Dallas. Prepackaged Coolhaus ice cream sammies, ice cream pints, and ice cream bars are sold in more than 2,500 retail stores, including Whole Foods, Gelson's Markets, Sprouts Farmers Market, Earth Fare, Fairway Market, Safeway, Publix and Wegman's. Coolhaus is also sold online.

Cookbook
Natasha Case and Freya Estreller, along with food writer Kathleen Squires wrote a cookbook called Coolhaus Ice Cream Book. It was published by Houghton Mifflin Harcourt in May 2014. The book has recipes for ice creams, gelatos, sorbets, cookies, toppings, and shakes.

See also 
 List of frozen dessert brands

References

External links

 

Ice cream brands
Brand name frozen desserts
Companies based in Los Angeles
Dairy products companies in California
2009 establishments in California
Restaurants established in 2009